Péter Szappanos (born 14 November 1990) is a Hungarian football player who currently plays for Budapest Honvéd.

International career
Szappanos was called up by the senior Hungary team for the Nations League matches against England (home), Italy (away), Germany (home) and England (away) on 4, 7, 11 and 14 June 2022 respectively.

Club statistics

Updated to games played as of 15 May 2022.

References

External links

1990 births
Living people
People from Jászberény
Hungarian footballers
Association football goalkeepers
Dunaharaszti MTK players
FC Tatabánya players
Zalaegerszegi TE players
Mezőkövesdi SE footballers
Nemzeti Bajnokság I players
Budapest Honvéd FC players
Sportspeople from Jász-Nagykun-Szolnok County